Mary Ann Ellen (18 June 1897 – 19 August 1949) was a New Zealand rural women's advocate, community leader and hairdresser. She was born in Glasgow, Lanarkshire, Scotland on 18 June 1897.

References

1897 births
1949 deaths
People from Glasgow
New Zealand Members of the Order of the British Empire